Ruth Rowan (born September 12, 1948) is an American politician from the U.S. state of West Virginia. She is a member of the Republican Party and served as a member the West Virginia House of Delegates from the 57th District, which represented parts of Mineral County and Hampshire County in West Virginia's Eastern Panhandle. In 2004, she defeated the embattled House Delegate Jerry Mezzatesta for his seat after he was embroiled in a political scandal in 2003-04.

Personal life 

Rowan was born in Pennsylvania. She was received her B.S. and M. Ed. from California University of Pennsylvania. She is a long-serving and now retired elementary school teacher in Hampshire County Schools. She married Tom Rowan and they had two children, Julie and Tom. The granddaughter of a coal miner, Rowan is one of few West Virginia Republicans endorsed by the United Mine Workers of America. She has been endorsed by the American Federation of Teachers, the National Education Association, the AFL-CIO, West Virginians for Life, and the National Rifle Association. A descendant of Frontier Ranger Doctor Llewellyn, her earliest forebears blazed a trail in the wilderness near the Forks of Cheat River in present-day Monongalia County, West Virginia.

Career
The West Virginia House of Delegates had often been reminded of West Virginia's most senior county by Rowan, who began each floor presentation with the phrase "from West Virginia's oldest county". She championed infrastructure, senior, veteran, children, education and healthcare issues. She was appointed to represent West Virginia in the United States' Southern Regional Education Conference to help shape emerging issues in education.

Rowan enjoyed broad based bipartisan support in both Charleston and her home district, as demonstrated by her strong showing in both primary and general elections. In the general election of 2010, Rowan garnered 72% of the vote, despite the endorsement of a well-funded challenger by several popular state and local elected officials.

See also
List of members of the 78th West Virginia House of Delegates
List of members of the 79th West Virginia House of Delegates
List of members of the 80th West Virginia House of Delegates

References

External links
 Ruth Rowan (R - Hampshire, 57) at the West Virginia House of Delegates
 

1948 births
Schoolteachers from West Virginia
American women educators
California University of Pennsylvania alumni
Living people
Republican Party members of the West Virginia House of Delegates
People from Hampshire County, West Virginia
West Virginia University alumni
Women state legislators in West Virginia
21st-century American politicians
21st-century American women politicians